The 1914 Idaho football team represented the University of Idaho in the 1914 college football season. Idaho was led by tenth-year head coach John G. Griffith. The first three games were at home in Moscow, with the opener at the fairgrounds, and two on campus at the new MacLean Field.

In the season opener, Idaho defeated Gonzaga  then played a scoreless tie with Montana in the mud in the MacLean Field debut.

After two consecutive wins in the series, Idaho lost to Washington State in the Battle of the Palouse, falling  at Rogers Field in Pullman. The weather was ideal but the only score was a drop-kick field goal in the second quarter. Nine years later, the Vandals won the first of three consecutive, their only three-peat in the rivalry series.

Idaho tallied a mere twelve points in its six games. In the opener, they scored on a field goal and a safety on a punt  then went scoreless in the next four games. The sole Idaho touchdown came in the final game on a forward pass for the game's only score.

It was Griffith's final year as head coach; he left for Oklahoma A&M (now Oklahoma State) in Stillwater.

Schedule

 The Little Brown Stein trophy for the Montana game debuted 24 years later in 1938
 One game was played on Thursday (against Whitman at Walla Walla on Thanksgiving)

References

External links
 Gem of the Mountains: 1916 University of Idaho yearbook (spring 1915) – 1914 football season
 Official game program: Idaho at Washington State – November 7, 1914
 Go Mighty Vandals – 1914 football season
 Idaho Argonaut – student newspaper – 1914 editions

Idaho
Idaho Vandals football seasons
Idaho football